Patrick Sindane is a South African politician. A member of the Economic Freedom Fighters, he was elected to the Gauteng Provincial Legislature in 2014. After the 2019 general election, Sindane became a member of the National Assembly of South Africa. Sindane served as an alternate member of the Portfolio Committee on Agriculture, Land Reform and Rural Development.

Sindane resigned from the National Assembly on 8 December 2021.

References

External links

Living people
Year of birth missing (living people)
Place of birth missing (living people)
Economic Freedom Fighters politicians
Members of the Gauteng Provincial Legislature
Members of the National Assembly of South Africa